Johnny, My Friend (Swedish: Janne, min vän) is the first novel by the Swedish author Peter Pohl. It was published in Sweden in 1985. The English translation by Laurie Thompson was published in 1991.

Plot summary
Johnny, My Friend is narrated by 12-year-old Krille. Krille is a naive youth, having grown up in a safe, supporting family in 1950s Stockholm. A new boy, Johnny, appears in Krille's life, and quickly impresses the neighborhood boys with his bicycling prowess.  His popularity aside, Johnny is a bit of a mystery, rarely saying anything about his life.  The boys of the neighborhood do not know where he lives, and sometimes he disappears for long periods, only to turn up again without explanation. Krille determines to solve the mystery of Johnny.

Translations
The novel has been translated into 11 languages:

Danish: Min bedste ven 1987 
Norwegian: Janne min venn 1988 
German: Jan, mein Freund 1990 (won the Deutscher Jugendliteraturpreis)
Dutch: Jan, mijn vriend 1991
English: Johnny, My Friend 1991 
French: Jan, mon ami 1995 
Italian: Il mio amico Jan 1996 
Estonian: Janne, mu sõber 1997 
Japanese: 『ヤンネ、ぼくの友だち』 1997 
Icelandic: Janni vinur minn 1997 
Low German: Jan, mien Fründ 2000

Film adaptation
The 1996 film My Friend Joe is based on the book.

References

1985 novels
Novels by Peter Pohl
Novels set in Stockholm
Fiction set in the 1950s
Swedish-language novels
Swedish children's novels
1985 children's books
1985 debut novels